William Blair (October 17, 1921 – April 20, 2014) was a Negro league pitcher.

Blair graduated Booker T. Washington High School in Dallas and briefly attended Prairie View A&M University. He began his baseball career at the age of 16, playing for a barnstorming team in Mineola, Texas, and went on to join the United States Army, where he became the youngest African American to serve as a first sergeant in the Army during World War II.

He pitched from 1946 to 1951, for teams including the Indianapolis Clowns, Cincinnati Crescents, and was a player-manager for the Dallas Black Giants. He played against players such as Cool Papa Bell, Satchel Paige, and Hilton Smith. After retiring from baseball, he became a fixture in the community, running a local newspaper, the Elite News, and organizing golf tournaments and parades. He died in Campbell, Texas in 2014.

William Blair Park in South Dallas, formerly Rochester Park, was named after him.

References

External links
 and Seamheads

1921 births

2014 deaths

United States Army personnel of World War II

Cincinnati Crescents players
Indianapolis Clowns players
Baseball players from Dallas
Baseball pitchers
Prairie View A&M University alumni
United States Army non-commissioned officers
African Americans in World War II
21st-century African-American people
African-American United States Army personnel